The 2015 Vuelta a Andalucía  (also known as the Ruta del Sol) was the 61st running of the Vuelta a Andalucía cycling stage race. It was rated as a 2.1 event on the 2015 UCI Europe Tour and was held from 18 to 22 February 2015, in the Andalusia region of southern Spain. Although the race lasted five days, there were six stages, with the first day split between two stages.

The previous three editions of the Vuelta a Andalucía had been won by Alejandro Valverde, but he chose to begin his season at the 2015 Tour of Oman instead. Chris Froome and Alberto Contador both chose to begin their 2015 seasons in Andalusia. Nairo Quintana also intended to start his season at this race, but he pulled out following a crash.

The race was closely contested by Contador and Froome. Contador took the lead in the race after the split first stage, beating Froome by eight seconds in the individual time trial. He then increased his lead in the general classification by winning the summit finish on stage 3. Froome, however, won the second summit finish on stage 4 to take the lead of the race by a two-second margin. He was able to defend this lead to the end of the race, so winning his first stage race since the previous May. Froome also won the points classification, and his team won the team classification, with four of their riders in the top 10 overall. The mountains classification was won by Pello Bilbao on the final stage.

Preview 
The Vuelta a Andalucía was a traditional early season race. Many riders in the modern peloton, however, chose to start their seasons in the Middle East rather than in Europe (the 2015 Tour of Oman ran at the same time). In 2015, these included Alejandro Valverde, who had won the Vuelta a Andalucía in 2012, 2013 and 2014, so he was not present to defend his title.

The Vuelta a Andalucía was particularly notable for its difficult, mountainous terrain. The 2015 edition, however, also featured an Individual time trial on the first day. The mountains were particularly difficult, with a summit finish at the Alto de Hazallanas on the third stage and another at Alto de Allanadas the following day. These three stages were seen as being the key to the general classification battle in the race.

The 2015 Vuelta a Andalucía was seen as the first 2015 meeting of several Grand Tour riders. In particular, it was considered to be a renewing of the rivalry between Chris Froome and Alberto Contador, both of whom were starting their seasons in Andalusia. Their rivalry had been a notable feature of the 2014 cycling season, especially at the Critérium du Dauphiné and the Vuelta a España. For both riders, this race was preparation for other events in 2015. Froome was targeting his second victory in the Tour de France, while Contador was aiming at victory in both the Tour and the Giro d'Italia. Both riders were targeting victory in the race as a test of their form at the beginning of the season. While the riders were seen as being closely matched in the mountains, it was thought that Froome would have an advantage in the time trial.

Initially, Nairo Quintana had also intended to start the race at the beginning of his European season, in preparation for the Tour de France. However, following his participation in the Tour de San Luis, Quintana was involved in a crash at the Colombian National Road Race Championships and pulled out of the Vuelta a Andalucía in order to recuperate.

Other general classification contenders at the race included Jean-Christophe Péraud, Bauke Mollema, Fränk Schleck (both ) and Jurgen Van den Broeck. The favourites for the three likely sprints included John Degenkolb and Tyler Farrar.

Teams 

22 teams were selected to take part in the 2015 event, including 10 UCI WorldTeams.

Route

Stages

Stage 1a 
18 February 2015 — La Rábida to Hinojos, 
Stage 1 was split into two parts: a road stage in the morning and an individual time trial in the afternoon. The morning stage was held over a  route from La Rábida to Hinojos. The first part of the course was flat, but the last part was hillier, with the first classified climb of the race and a gradual incline to the finish.

The early break was formed by Reinier Honig, Christopher Jones, Ibai Salas and Aleksandr Komin. Sander Helven also put in an attack but was unable to escape from the pack.

 led the peloton across the categorised climb and intermediate sprint point, and it seemed likely that the stage would end in a sprint. Crashes, however, eliminated a large number of riders (including all but one of the  team) and split the peloton, so none of the sprinters' teams were able to control the conclusion of the race. Pim Ligthart (the one remaining rider from ) attacked with approximately  remaining and was able to hold off the chasing pack. Fábio Silvestre and Grega Bole finished second and third. Ligthart took the overall lead of the race and the points competition, while  took the lead in the mountains classification (with Kanstantsin Sivtsov), the intermediate sprints competition (with Peter Kennaugh) and the team classification.

Fränk Schleck was among the riders affected by the crashes, suffering a muscular injury to his quadriceps, and was forced to abandon the race.

Stage 1b 
18 February 2015 — Coria del Río to Coria del Río, individual time trial (ITT)
The afternoon stage was an  individual time trial in Coria del Río. Unusually for a time trial, the roads were in poor condition and were very dusty.

The stage was won by Javier Moreno, with a time of 9' 51" – his first victory in an individual time trial. Wilco Kelderman was two seconds back in second place and Jérôme Coppel four seconds back in third. Pim Ligthart lost his race lead; Alberto Contador took the red jersey with Bob Jungels on the same time. Chris Froome finished eight seconds behind Contador in what was the first significant meeting of the two favourites for the 2015 Tour de France.

Stage 2 
19 February 2015 — Utrera to Lucena, 
Stage 2 took the riders , from Utrera to Lucena. The first part of the course was flat, but it became increasingly hilly towards the end of the race. The one classified climb of the day came within the final , before the riders tackled an uphill section approaching the finish.

There was a five-man breakaway early in the stage, formed of Nicolas Dougall, Adrian Honkisz, Aleksandr Komin, Pirmin Lang and Sjoerd van Ginneken. They gained a lead of about five minutes, but were caught with  remaining, before the beginning of the final climb.

There were further attacks on the climb, principally from Nicolas Edet, who won the mountains classification points at the summit. Carlos Quintero, Mirko Selvaggi and Peter Kennaugh all attacked on the descent, but were controlled by the peloton. Race leader Alberto Contador also attacked on the run to the finish, without success.

John Degenkolb was the favourite to win from the remaining group, but he was surprised by a sprint from  out by Juan José Lobato. Degenkolb attempted to chase Lobato, but Lobato won by several bike lengths for his second win of 2015. Bob Jungels was in second place before the stage, but could not follow the pace on the final climb and so dropped out of the top 10. Beñat Intxausti moved up to second, while Chris Froome in third place was one of four  riders in the top 10.

Stage 3 
20 February 2015 — Motril to Alto de Hazallanas, 
Stage three was a  route from Motril to Alto de Hazallanas, the first summit finish of the race. It was regarded beforehand as the first major confrontation between Alberto Contador and Chris Froome. There were two climbs in the first  of the stage, before a long flat section leading up to the final climb.

 controlled the peloton through most of the day and onto the early slopes of the final climb, reducing the group to 40 riders as they approached the most difficult part. Contador attacked in the early part of the climb, with support from his teammate Ivan Basso. At the moment of Contador's attack, the peloton was in confusion and Froome was not in the main chasing group. Basso and Contador rode away from the rest of the field. The main chase was led by Romain Bardet, Peter Kennaugh, Beñat Intxausti and Daniel Navarro. After Contador had left Basso behind, he built a lead of 30 to 40 seconds over the group behind, riding without a power meter because of interference from the television motorcycles. Kennaugh was leading this group on behalf of Chris Froome, who had bridged over.

With four kilometres remaining, Froome set off alone in pursuit of Contador, repeating scenes from the 2014 Vuelta a España. Contador won the stage ahead of Froome, who had partially closed the gap, and was now just 19 seconds behind; Bardet was over a minute further back in third place. Contador therefore extended his overall lead to 27 seconds over Froome, still one of four  riders in the top ten. Contador and Froome, first and second now in general classification, had put significant time into all other competitors. Both leading riders declared themselves pleased with their performances early in the season. Contador was optimistic about retaining his overall lead to the end of the race, while Froome pointed to Contador's plans to ride the 2015 Giro d'Italia as a reason for his better form.

Stage 4 
21 February 2015 — Maracena to Alto de Allanadas, 

Stage 4 was another summit finish, with the climb of Alto de Allanadas coming after  of racing. There were several small climbs before the steep  climb to the finish, that included sections of around 20% incline. The difficulty was increased by tricky weather conditions, including fog, rain and cold temperatures.

The early part of the stage featured a breakaway of five riders: Edward Theuns, Romain Sicard, Hugh Carthy, Simon Geschke and Mirko Selvaggi. With  remaining, only Geschke and Selvaggi were left. As  took up the chase at the foot of the climb, Selvaggi was on his own. Nicolas Roche  did a long spell riding on the front of the lead group on behalf of Froome; after this, their teammate Peter Kennaugh made a solo attack that brought Selvaggi back. Another Sky rider, Mikel Nieve, then put in a brief attack, before Froome attacked on one of the steepest parts of the climb. Contador was able to stay with Froome for the first  of his attack, but was then dropped.

Froome then rode solo to the end of the stage, using his power meter to judge his effort, and was able to ride away from Contador. Despite Contador's best efforts, the time gap increased. At the finish line, Froome was 29 seconds ahead of Contador, overturning his 27-second deficit from the start of the stage, thus moving into the overall lead of the race by two seconds. Froome took over the lead in both the overall and mountains classifications, while Contador retained his lead in the points competition.

Stage 5 
22 February 2015 — Montilla to Alhaurín de la Torre, 
The final stage of the race was a  route from Montilla to Alhaurín de la Torre. There was one classified climb on the route, which was fairly hilly throughout. The final part, however, was mostly flat or downhill until the last kilometre, which was uphill.

The day's breakaway was formed by Johnny Hoogerland, Pello Bilbao, Songezo Jim, Merhawi Kudus (both ), Rodolfo Torres, Maciej Paterski and Víctor Martín. With  remaining, Edward Theuns attacked and was able to form a gap back to the peloton, but he was unable to hold on to win the stage. Lobato attacked from the peloton, with Degenkolb following, and was able to take a clear victory. Degenkolb was a second back, with Sylvain Chavanel leading the peloton across the finishing line a further second behind.

Froome and Contador were both towards the front of the peloton in the finale: Contador was prepared to attack if possible, but the climb was not hard enough to allow him to form an advantage. Froome finished sixth on the stage, with Contador on the same time in ninth, so the general classification was unchanged. Froome lost his mountains leadership to Bilbao, who won the sprint at the only climb of the day. Froome, however, did win the points classification by one point ahead of Contador.

Classification leadership table 

There were four major classifications in the 2015 Vuelta a Andalucía.

The first and most important classification was the general classification. This was calculated by adding together the times of each rider cumulatively across the six stages. There were no bonus seconds awarded. If two riders were tied on the same time, they would be differentiated by the precise time recorded in the individual time trial. The leader of the competition after each stage was awarded a red jersey; the leader of the general classification after the final stage was considered the winner of the race.

The second classification was the points classification. After each stage or split stage, the top 15 riders were awarded a number of points (25 for the stage winner, 20 for the rider in second place, down to 1 point for the rider in 15th place). The rider with the most points at the end of the race was the winner of the classification. The points leader wore a blue jersey.

The mountains classification was determined by points won at the categorised climbs on the route. There were three categories of climbs: the most difficult climbs won ten points for the first rider to the summit; the winners of second category climbs won six; the winners of third category climbs won three. The rider with the most points was the mountains winner and won the green jersey.

There was also an intermediate sprints classification. At each individual sprint, there were points awarded for the first, second and third riders across the line (3, 2 and 1 points respectively). The rider with the most points gained at these intermediate sprints was the winner of the sprints classification, which earned him the white jersey.

The teams classification was calculated by taking the best three riders on each team on each stage and adding their times together. The team with the lowest cumulative time was the winner of the classification.

There were also three minor prizes awarded after the final stage. There were trophies to the best Spanish rider and the best Andalusian rider in the general classification. Finally, here was a trophy for the winner of the combination classification. This was calculated by adding up each rider's position in the general, points and mountains classification. The rider with the lowest number won.

Minor classifications

References

External links 

Vuelta a Andalucia
Vuelta a Andalucia
Vuelta a Andalucía by year